The SLC National Super League is a limited overs cricket tournament which was held in Sri Lanka from 24 January to 19 February 2022. The first phase of the 50-over competition was played in two venues: SSC and P. Sara Oval. The second phase of the round-robin stage was played in Pallekelle and Dambulla, where the final was played on 19 February.

Squads 
The following teams and squads were named for the tournament.

Points table 

 Advanced to the Final

Fixtures and results 
The SLC confirmed the fixtures for the tournament on 23 January 2022.

Round-robin

Final

References

External links 
 Series home at ESPN Cricinfo
 Match fixtures at srilankacricket.lk

SLC National Super League